The North Dakota State Capitol is the house of government of the U.S. state of North Dakota. The capitol, a 21-story Art Deco tower, is located in Bismarck at 600 East Boulevard Avenue, and is the tallest habitable building in the state. On a  campus that also houses many other government buildings, the capitol building and the surrounding office buildings house the state's legislative and judicial branches, as well as many government agencies.

The State Capitol is largely surrounded by state government buildings. The parks, walking trails, and monuments on the grounds provide a great deal of information about the state's history, making it one of the city's tourist attractions. Six buildings occupy the grounds; constructed as the government grew. Not all state agencies are housed on the grounds, however: a large number are spread throughout the city in other facilities. The state facility management division developed plans for a massive expansion and improvement of the grounds in 2000, but very little of the plan had been implemented by 2012.

History

The first capitol building was constructed between 1883 and 1884 to house the territorial government, and after statehood, two additions were erected: the Senate wing (1894, south side), and the House wing (ca. 1903, north side). On the morning of December 28, 1930, smoke was spotted coming from the northeast part of the original building, and despite the fire department being summoned within minutes of the fire being noticed, it was already too late to save the structure. Even as the fire raged through the upper portions of the building, efforts were made by citizens and state employees to rescue what was possible before everyone was ordered out of the building mid-morning. It was later determined to likely have originated in a pile of oily rags in a janitor's closet on the top floor of the main part of the building, as work had been underway to clean and varnish the legislators' desks in preparation for the upcoming legislative session. North Dakota Secretary of State Robert Byrne saved the original copy of the state's constitution, but suffered cuts and burns on his hands while breaking a window to reach the document. Another state employee, Jennie Ulsrud, burned her hands when she attempted to save records in the state treasurer's office. Governor George F. Shafer came back from his visit to St. Paul, Minnesota while the fire was still burning. Upon arrival, he immediately assembled a team of state legislators and officials to discuss plans for coping with the loss of records and work space. As soon as it was safe to enter the interior of the still smoldering building, 40 state prison inmates were used to salvage the various departments' vaults and other items from the ruins (some vaults were burned, but most were found to be intact when opened). The Legislature met temporarily in Bismarck's War Memorial Building and the City Auditorium, an annex being constructed to link the two. State offices were spread out across all available space across town, including an entire floor of the Patterson Hotel downtown. Such was the need for space that the unburned lower floors of the original capitol's 1903 wing were even repaired and returned to use.

The disaster required the construction of a new building during the Great Depression. The tower and wing were built between 1931 and 1934, at a cost of $2 million. Governor George F. Shafer broke ground for the building on August 13, 1932. Workers on the building were paid only 30 cents an hour and, after multiple worker strikes, the capitol grounds were administered by martial law in June 1933. The state sold half of the original capitol campus to defray the cost of construction.  Artist Edgar Miller was brought in to do much of the interior design and decoration as well as the bas-relief sculptures on the facade which depict the human history of North Dakota.

The new 19-story capitol was expected to provide ample space for years to come, however it quickly filled as the state government expanded. The Liberty Memorial Building, completed in 1924, was able to house some of the additional workers, but more space was needed by 1955 when construction began for the State Office Building. The building originally housed the Bismarck Junior College, but the Legislature purchased it in 1959. The 1960s was a period of rapid development of the grounds. In 1960, the new governor's residence replaced the old residence which was deteriorating. In 1980, expanding State Historical Society of North Dakota moved into the new North Dakota Heritage Center and in 1968, the North Dakota Department of Transportation occupied the building designed to provide it more office space. The Transportation Building is the last constructed on the campus to date, although a Judicial Wing was added onto the base of the capitol tower between 1977 and 1981. While the space needed by state government has increased since the original construction of the Capitol in the 1930s, the state's population has decreased.

Layout
The state capitol grounds has six buildings: the capitol building, the Department of Transportation Building, the North Dakota Heritage Center, the Liberty Memorial Building, the governor's residence, and the State Office Building. Additionally, the campus holds Myron Atkinson Park and the Capitol Park. Through the center of the grounds is the Capitol Mall, a large open field of grass with walking paths lined by American Elm trees. The Mall was the site of the state's snow angel world record breaking in 2007, with 8,962 people sprawled out on the snow-covered mall; a picture was taken from the top of the Capitol tower.

Buildings

State Capitol
This tower houses the office of the governor and the offices of multiple state agencies and departments. At the tower's base, in the west wing, the two chambers of the legislature meet when in session while the state supreme court meets in the east wing. The 18th floor of the Capitol is an observation deck with the highest vantage point in the state.

The south side of the Capitol building features a drive-through tunnel which leads to an entrance to the building. This was accessible by public vehicles until 2001 when it was closed due to security measures after the September 11, 2001, attacks. Today, only pedestrians are able to enter the tunnel. In 1988, U.S. President George H. W. Bush presented and dedicated an American Elm tree near the Capitol steps in commemoration of the state's Centennial of 1989.

The many windows on the capitol building's tower are used for several ongoing traditions. During the Christmas season, red and green shades are drawn over the windows and lights are turned on in certain offices to make a pattern that resembles a Christmas tree. During the New Year's Eve, office lights are turned on to spell out the new year; the first two numbers of the new year are given on the top half, and the last two numbers on the bottom. This tradition began during the 1970s, and is now done on all four sides of the building; the Christmas tree tradition began as early as the 1940s.

Tours of the capitol building are available on weekdays. Weekend tours are available Memorial Day through Labor Day. Tours include stops throughout both the building's legislative and judicial wings as well as an elevator ride to the top of the tower.

Judicial Wing

The judicial wing serves as a hub for the state supreme court and its support staff, as well as office space for state agencies like the Department of Health and the Department of Human Resources. The design for the building began in May 1977, construction began in April 1979 and it was finished completely and occupied by 1981. The dedication for the addition was held on November 15, 1981, with both Governor Allen Olson and former Governor Arthur A. Link present at the ceremony. Included in the wing is the Capitol lunchroom, which serves food to state employees and even the general public on weekdays.

Prior to the 2017 Legislative Assembly, two new committee rooms were added in the Judicial Wing (in a space vacated by the Information Technology Department).  These rooms are used by various legislative committees when the Assembly is in session, and by the Judicial branch when the Legislature is not meeting.

Liberty Memorial Building
The Liberty Memorial Building is home to the State Library, as well as offices for the North Dakota Parks & Recreation Department. The building's construction was authorized by the state's legislature in 1919 in response to an increase of governmental departments and the project was finished by 1924 with a cost of $350,000. The building originally housed the State Historical Society Museum, the Adjutant General, the State Library Commission, and the supreme court until the State Library occupied it. The building is the oldest facility still on the capitol grounds and was renovated in 1982 to conform with modern building codes.

Department of Transportation building

The North Dakota Department of Transportation Building is home to the central office of the state's transportation department, as well as small divisions of other agencies. The building was completed in 1968 with materials that harmonize visually with the earlier structures. Before it was consolidated in this building, the Department of Transportation, known then as the State Highway Department, occupied several buildings around the campus including the State Office Building and the capitol. The building contains  of space and is just to the east of the capitol tower. While above ground the building is separated from the tower, it is connected to the Judicial Wing by a tunnel accessible only to state employees.

North Dakota Heritage Center

The North Dakota Heritage Center building is home to the Heritage Center museum which stores and displays artifacts from around the state. The building also is home to office space for the North Dakota State Historical Society which operates the museum. Planning for the building began as early as 1963 and upon completion of the structure in 1981, the State Historical Society moved from the Liberty Memorial Building into its new Heritage Center quarters.

In 2006, state officials revealed a massive expansion plan for the center. The construction cost approximately $50 million and nearly doubled the size of the complex adding three large galleries to the east of the existing structure, as well as a new main entry fronting State Street. Funding for the project consisted of twenty percent private, twenty percent federal, and sixty percent state. In addition to the new gallery area, the expansion includes a 50-seat digital auditorium, climate-controlled storage areas, a café, a children's gallery, expanded visitors service and store, and the Corridor of History, a -wide walkway spanning the length of the expansion with a glazed southern exposure on one side and digital murals on the other.

State Office Building
The State Office Building, on the complex's southeast corner, contains the Water Commission, in addition to several divisions of the office of the Attorney General: the Civil Litigation Division and the Natural Resources and Indian Affairs attorneys. Built in 1955, the structure housed the Bismarck Junior College until 1961 when the legislature authorized its purchase. Since then, it has been home for various state agencies. During the 1991-1993 biennium, the building underwent massive renovation and was re-faced with an exterior that blended more harmoniously with the complex's other buildings. At , the building is the smallest of the those housing offices.

North Dakota Governor's Residence

Prior to 1960, North Dakota's First Family lived in a house off the capitol grounds. In 1960, the state constructed a residence near 4th Street on the west side of the campus to replace the outdated residence. In 2015, the legislature authorized a new residence adjacent to the current facility that would address security and accessibility issues. The state offered the structure to anyone who would relocate it, but received no bids, so it was demolished. The new structure had an anticipated cost of $5 million with a requirement $1 million be raised by private donations. The governor's family occupied the new residence in March 2018.

Outdoor facilities

Parks
Two parks, the Myron Atkinson Park and the Capitol Park occupy space on the capitol grounds. The Myron Atkinson Park, named after the Bismarck attorney Myron Atkinson, is east of State Street. Pedestrians can access the park via a tunnel. The Capitol Park is at the northwest corner of the grounds at the intersection of 4th Street and Divide Avenue and includes a playground with trees and shrubs planted by the Farwest Rotary Club.

Arboretum Trail
The Arboretum Trail is a walking trail winding through a wooded area on the west side of the grounds. Walkers pass 60-million-year-old petrified tree stumps from the Amidon, North Dakota, area, as well as 75 different species of trees and shrubs which are labeled with ground plaques. Various statues and memorials are also on the trail. The trail was created in 1985 in anticipation of the state's centennial and as an opportunity for state employees and the public to exercise while learning about various trees and the history of the buildings on the grounds. Many area schools take their students to the trail for nature walks and students have used the various trees for leaf collections. This damaged some of the trees, so signs that forbid leaf picking were posted.

Prairie Trail
The Prairie Trail runs north of the Capitol's Judicial Wing, taking pedestrians into an area filled with examples of grasses and wild flowers which are typical of native prairie. In 2006, the trail was expanded to take walkers from the corner of State Street and Divide Avenue south into the main grounds area. The original trail was dedicated with a plaque in 1987 and the wild grassland surrounding the trail was registered as a state Natural Area by the Parks and Recreation Department.

Statues and monuments

Pioneer Family
The Pioneer Family statue is one of the most prominent on the grounds, as it is on the southern end of the mall in the foreground of the capitol tower. The statue was sculpted in 1946 by Avard Fairbanks and dedicated to honor the memory of the great northwest.

All Veterans Memorial
The All Veterans Memorial is a large monument south of the Heritage Center, along a walking path. The memorial is to all North Dakotans who served in the armed forces during the first 100 years of statehood was finished and dedicated on June 10, 1989. The names of 4,050 men and women who died in the nation's wars are inscribed on the bronze tablets displayed under a large block of stone supported by columns. The monument is lit during the night. Stone benches are available for seating.

Other statues
Other statues on the capitol grounds include Sakakawea, John Burke, Cortés, Buffalo, Pioneers of the Future, Purple Heart Memorial, Peace Officers Memorial, French Gratitude, and USS North Dakota bowplate.

See also
List of tallest buildings by U.S. state
List of state and territorial capitols in the United States

Notes

External links 

North Dakota State Capitol history 
Virtual tours of North Dakota State Capitol and grounds
Tour information
Map of the North Dakota State Capitol

Government buildings in North Dakota
Capitol
State capitols in the United States
Art Deco architecture in North Dakota
Joseph Bell DeRemer buildings
Skyscrapers in North Dakota
History museums in North Dakota
Museums in Bismarck, North Dakota
Skyscraper office buildings in North Dakota
Government buildings completed in 1932
1932 establishments in North Dakota